Peter Wanner Mansion, also known as "Mount Penn Home" is a historic mansion located at Reading, Berks County, Pennsylvania.  The house is situated at the base of Mount Penn overlooking the city of Reading.  It was built in 1889, and is a "T"-plan, -story, dwelling in the Late Victorian style.  It is constructed of squared, rectangular limestone and features a stone segmental arched portal, broad front porch, and -story central frame tower.  It was converted into apartments in the 1930s or 1940s.

It was listed on the National Register of Historic Places in 1987.

References

Buildings and structures in Reading, Pennsylvania
Houses on the National Register of Historic Places in Pennsylvania
Houses completed in 1889
Houses in Berks County, Pennsylvania
National Register of Historic Places in Reading, Pennsylvania